Márcio Vieira de Vasconcelos (born 10 October 1984), known as Vieira, is an Andorran footballer who plays for Spanish club Atlético Monzón as a midfielder.

Club career
Born in Andorra la Vella to Portuguese parents who hailed from Marco de Canaveses, Porto District, Vieira's biggest achievement as a professional was appearing for F.C. Marco in two Portuguese second division seasons even though he only played a total of 15 matches, all in 2005–06. He has spent the remainder of his career in Spanish amateur football, his first club being SE Eivissa-Ibiza.

International career
Vieira won his first cap for the Andorra national team on 12 October 2005, starting and being replaced early into the second half of a 0–3 home loss against Armenia for the 2006 FIFA World Cup qualifiers. He played his 100th international on 17 November 2020, in the 5–0 defeat to Latvia for the 2020–21 UEFA Nations League.

International goal
Scores and results list Andorra's goal tally first.

See also
List of men's footballers with 100 or more international caps

References

External links

National team data

1984 births
Living people
People from Andorra la Vella
Andorran people of Portuguese descent
Andorran footballers
Portuguese footballers
Association football midfielders
Liga Portugal 2 players
Segunda Divisão players
F.C. Marco players
Tercera División players
Tercera Federación players
Divisiones Regionales de Fútbol players
CD Teruel footballers
Atlético Monzón players
Andorra international footballers
Andorran expatriate footballers
Portuguese expatriate footballers
Expatriate footballers in Spain
Andorran expatriate sportspeople in Spain
Portuguese expatriate sportspeople in Spain
FIFA Century Club